The British School in Panchkula, India is an international school, affiliated to Central Board of Secondary Education. The school is up to Senior Secondary offering Humanities and Commerce. The British School, Panchkula is run under the aegis of Urmila T R Sethi Global Foundation.

External links
 Official website
 World wide schools information

International schools in India
High schools in India
Panchkula